Satchmo at Pasadena is a live album by Louis Armstrong that was recorded at the Pasadena Civic Auditorium in 1951.

Reception

Al Campbell at AllMusic gave the album four stars and said, "At the time of this concert, musicians began to take advantage of the new LP format that allowed them to bypass the usual three-minute time constraints of 78 rpm and stretch out a bit. Armstrong was no exception, and even though Satchmo is more of the ringleader/vocalist/showman on this set, the All-Stars provide some heated improvising, especially Hines on 'Honeysuckle Rose' and Bigard's clarinet solo on the otherwise knockabout version of 'Just You, Just Me.'" Campbell criticized the Verve Records CD reissue of the album, as the tracks were presented out of sequence and numerous tracks were omitted.

Track listing
 "Back Home Again in Indiana" (James F. Hanley, Ballard MacDonald) – 5:31
 "Baby, It's Cold Outside" (Frank Loesser) – 5:42
 "Way Down Yonder in New Orleans" (Henry Creamer, Turner Layton) – 5:42
 "Stardust" (Hoagy Carmichael, Mitchell Parish) – 3:33
 "The Hucklebuck" (Roy Alfred, Andy Gibson) – 3:34
 "Honeysuckle Rose" (Andy Razaf, Fats Waller) – 3:56
 "Just You, Just Me" (Jesse Greer, Raymond Klages) – 6:22
 "My Monday Date" (Earl Hines) – 6:37
 "You Can Depend on Me" (Charles Carpenter, Louis Dunlap, Earl Hines) – 4:07
 "That's a Plenty" (Lew Pollack) – 3:01

Personnel
 Louis Armstrong – trumpet, vocals
 Jack Teagarden – trombone
 Barney Bigard – clarinet
 Earl Hines – piano
 Arvell Shaw – double bass
 Cozy Cole – drums
 Velma Middleton – vocals

Production
Gene Norman – liner notes, producer
Andy Kman – production coordination
Ellen Fitton – mastering
Harry Weinger – reissue supervisor

References

Decca Records live albums
Louis Armstrong live albums
1951 live albums
Verve Records live albums